Elmore City is a town in Garvin County, Oklahoma, United States. This town is fifty-eight miles south of Oklahoma City. The population was 697 at the 2010 census. It was named after J. O. Elmore.

There are two main highways running through Elmore City. One of the Highways is Oklahoma State Highway 29, running west–east. The other is Oklahoma State Highway 74, running north–south. It is about 12 miles west of Wynnewood, 25.5 miles south of Purcell, and about 23 miles west of U.S. Highway 177.

History 
The first business in Elmore City was opened by Jasper N. Black in an area just northeast of what is now Elmore City. Historians state that after Black opened his supply store in 1890 on Rock Creek, the number of settlers quickly grew and a community was formed called Banner. Banner quickly spread to the southwest and a post office was established and the name changed to Elmore for J. O. Elmore, another prominent business man. The word city was added to Elmore after the name was confused with Elmer in Jackson County. The city was incorporated as a community in 1898.

At the time of its founding, Elmore City was located in Pickens County, Chickasaw Nation.

The 1984 film Footloose is loosely based on events that took place in the town.

Geography
Elmore City is located at  (34.623424, -97.395707).

Demographics

As of the census of 2010, there were 697 people living in the town. There were 337 housing units at an average density of 674 per square mile (280.8/km2). The racial makeup of the town was 91.40% White, 4.50% Native American, 0.53% Asian, and 3.57% from two or more races. Hispanic or Latino of any race were 1.46% of the population.

There were 328 households, out of which 29.6% had children under the age of 18 living with them, 47.9% were married couples living together, 9.5% had a female householder with no husband present, and 37.5% were non-families. 34.5% of all households were made up of individuals, and 20.4% had someone living alone who was 65 years of age or older. The average household size was 2.30 and the average family size was 2.97.

In the town, the population was spread out, with 25.3% under the age of 18, 8.9% from 18 to 24, 25.4% from 25 to 44, 20.4% from 45 to 64, and 20.1% who were 65 years of age or older. The median age was 37 years. For every 100 females, there were 89.5 males. For every 100 females age 18 and over, there were 84.6 males.

The median income for a household in the town was $23,810, and the median income for a family was $25,000. Males had a median income of $22,083 versus $17,159 for females. The per capita income for the town was $12,486. About 13.8% of families and 14.7% of the population were below the poverty line, including 20.4% of those under age 18 and 15.5% of those age 65 or over.

There is one school system, Elmore City-Pernell public schools, which consists of Elmore City-Pernell Elementary and Elmore City-Pernell High School. Their school mascot is Bogey the Badger. The school colors are purple and white. There is also one cemetery, Elmore City Cemetery

References

External links
 City of Elmore City Facebook Page
 Cemetery Index
 Encyclopedia of Oklahoma History and Culture - Elmore City

Towns in Garvin County, Oklahoma
Towns in Oklahoma